Below is a list to links to the list of Super Y League clubs. The Super Y League is one of the most competitive youth soccer leagues in American soccer along with the Development Academy. Many of the past and current clubs are affiliated with MLS and USL professional teams. Super Y was also hit hard by the creation of the Development Academy program in 2007. Many of the top-tier clubs placed their teams in the new program rather than Super Y.

Mid-Atlantic Division

Current clubs

Former clubs

Midwest Division

Current clubs

Midwest

Former clubs

New England Division

Current clubs

Former clubs

North Atlantic Division

Current Clubs

Former clubs
None

South Atlantic Division

Current clubs

Former clubs

South East Division

Current clubs

Former clubs

Canada West Division

Current clubs
None

Former clubs

Pacific North California Division

Current clubs
None

Former clubs

Pacific Northwest Division

Current clubs
None

Former clubs

Pacific South California Division

Current clubs
None

Former clubs

Rocky Mountain Division

Current clubs
None

Former clubs

See also
Super Y League
United Soccer Leagues
U.S. Soccer Development Academy

Super Y League